Muhammed Bhola is a wrestler from Pakistan.

He competed at the 1994 Commonwealth Games, where he won a bronze medal for wrestling in the Men's Middleweight class.

References

Pakistani male sport wrestlers
Commonwealth Games medallists in wrestling
Commonwealth Games bronze medallists for Pakistan
Wrestlers at the 1994 Commonwealth Games
Living people
Year of birth missing (living people)
Medallists at the 1994 Commonwealth Games